Castanospora is a monotypic genus of trees, constituting part of the plant family Sapindaceae. The sole species Castanospora alphandii, commonly known as brown tamarind, grows naturally in the Australian rainforests of north-eastern New South Wales and eastern Queensland as far north as the Wet Tropics rainforests of north-eastern Queensland.

Brown tamarind is known in horticulture, though it is only distantly related to the true tamarind.

References

External links

Sapindaceae
Monotypic Sapindaceae genera
Sapindales of Australia
Flora of New South Wales
Flora of Queensland
Taxa named by Ferdinand von Mueller